Jack Forster (born 19 March 1987 in Wigan, England) is a rugby union player for Sale Sharks in the Aviva Premiership. He usually plays at prop.

Forster played rugby for both Bolton School and Aspull Rugby Club.  He moved onto playing for Sedgley Park Rugby Club before being contracted by Sale Sharks.  While at Bolton School he was named as School Captain and Captain of the Rugby team.

Forster scored a try on his first appearance for both Gloucester Rugby and England Saxons, the latter coming against the USA at the 2007 Churchill Cup.

For the 2007/08 and 2008/09 seasons Forster, like the other England Academy players at Gloucester Rugby, was dual-registered with Moseley and played for both clubs during this time.

Once again in 2008, Forster was selected in the England Saxons squad, to compete at the 2008 Churchill Cup.

In March 2009, Forster was re-signed for Sale Sharks on a two-year deal.

References

External links
Bolton School Site
Moseley Profile
Gloucester Rugby Profile
Sale Sharks Profile
England Profile

1987 births
Living people
English rugby union players
Gloucester Rugby players
Moseley Rugby Football Club players
People educated at Bolton School
Rugby union players from Wigan
Rugby union props
Sale Sharks players
Sedgley Park R.U.F.C. players